Bernadotte Township is a township in Nicollet County, Minnesota, United States. The population was 346 at the 2000 census. There is an unincorporated community named Bernadotte that is located in the northern part of the township.

Bernadotte Township was organized in 1869, and named for Jean Baptiste Jules Bernadotte, a French Jacobines leader, later French Marshal, later King Charles XIV John of Sweden and founder of the House of Bernadotte.

Geography

Demographics
As of the census of 2000, there were 346 people, 110 households, and 91 families residing in the township. The population density was 9.6 people per square mile (3.7/km2).  There were 114 housing units at an average density of 3.2/sq mi (1.2/km2). The racial makeup of the township was 98.55% White, and 1.45% from two or more races. Hispanic or Latino of any race were 0.29% of the population.

There were 110 households, out of which 47.3% had children under the age of 18 living with them, 80.0% were married couples living together, 1.8% had a female householder with no husband present, and 16.4% were non-families. 16.4% of all households were made up of individuals, and 5.5% had someone living alone who was 65 years of age or older. The average household size was 3.15 and the average family size was 3.55.

In the township the population was spread out, with 37.0% under the age of 18, 3.8% from 18 to 24, 29.2% from 25 to 44, 20.2% from 45 to 64, and 9.8% who were 65 years of age or older. The median age was 34 years. For every 100 females, there were 112.3 males. For every 100 females age 18 and over, there were 111.7 males.

The median income for a household in the township was $43,333, and the median income for a family was $43,750. Males had a median income of $27,411 versus $23,750 for females. The per capita income for the township was $15,233. About 7.1% of families and 6.0% of the population were below the poverty line, including 3.0% of those under age 18 and 16.1% of those age 65 or over.

References

Townships in Nicollet County, Minnesota
Mankato – North Mankato metropolitan area
Townships in Minnesota